The Milan Triennial XVI was the Triennial in Milan sanctioned by the Bureau of International Expositions (BIE) and held at the  in 1979.

Exhibits included 's audiovisual space Real Space-Virtual-Space.

References 

1979 in Italy
Tourist attractions in Milan
World's fairs in Milan